George Richard Piktuzis (January 3, 1932 – November 28, 1993) was an American professional baseball player, a left-handed pitcher who appeared as a relief pitcher in two games for the  Chicago Cubs of Major League Baseball.

Piktuzis' professional career lasted six seasons (1950–52; 1955–57). His MLB appearances came in April 1956 against the St. Louis Cardinals and Cincinnati Redlegs. He surrendered four earned runs and six hits, including a home run by Cincinnati's George Crowe, in five innings pitched.  As a minor leaguer, he compiled a 34–62 (.354) record in 176 games.

George Piktuzis died in Long Beach, California, at the age of 61.

References

External links
Major League playing record from Baseball Reference

1932 births
1993 deaths
Baseball players from Chicago
Chicago Cubs players
Decatur Commodores players
Des Moines Bruins players
Grand Rapids Jets players
Los Angeles Angels (minor league) players
Major League Baseball pitchers
Memphis Chickasaws players
Tulsa Oilers (baseball) players